= Wilson Thomas =

American football player (born 1979)

Wilson Thomas (born October 21, 1979) is a former American football wide receiver in the Arena Football League who played for the Arizona Rattlers. He played college football for the Nebraska Cornhuskers.

He also played for the Nebraska Cornhuskers basketball team.
